"The Time of Your Life" is a 1958 live television version of William Saroyan's play starring Jackie Gleason, directed by Tom Donovan, and adapted by A. J. Russell.  The telecast was shown on October 9, 1958 and was the third episode of the third season of the anthology series Playhouse 90.  The supporting cast features Jack Klugman, Dick York, Betsy Palmer, Bert Freed, Gloria Vanderbilt and Dina Merrill.

Plot
The film follows the adventures of a group of regulars at Nick's 'Pacific Street Saloon, Restaurant and Entertainment Palace' in San Francisco. A sign outside tells people to come in as they are. At the center is the wealthy Joe, who has given up working to hold court at Nick's bar. He desires to live "a civilized life" without hurting anyone and believes the real truth in people is found in their dreams of themselves, not the hard facts of their actual existence.

Cast

Jackie Gleason as Joe
Jack Klugman as Nick
Dick York as Tom
Betsy Palmer as Kitty Duval
Bert Freed as Blick
Gloria Vanderbilt as Elsie
Dina Merrill as Mary
Bobby Van as Harry
Carlos Montalban as The Arab
James Barton as Kit Carson (Reprising his role from the Cagney film)
Terry Carter as Wesley
Lynne Forrester as Friend
Steve Franken as Willie
Billy M. Greene as The Drunk
Ray McHugh as The Newsboy
Jeri Archer as Killer

Production

Development
A feature film starring James Cagney had been released a decade earlier.

References

External links

1958 American television episodes
1958 television plays
Playhouse 90 (season 3) episodes